A wolf tone is an unintended sound quality of an instrument in the violin family.

Wolf tone or Wolfe Tone may also refer to:

Music
 Wolf interval, ratio of pitches appearing in some musical temperaments
 Wolfe Tone Societies, Irish republican group
 Wolf Tone, a British record label founded by Paul Epworth 
 The Wolfe Tones, Irish band

Sports

Ireland
 Wolfe Tones GAA, a GAA club in Oristown and Kilberry, County Meath
 Wolfe Tones GAA (Longford), a hurling-focused GAA club in Mostrim, County Longford
 Wolfe Tones GFC Drogheda, a Gaelic football club in Drogheda, County Louth
 Wolfe Tones na Sionna GAA, a GAA club in Shannon, County Clare

Northern Ireland
 Bellaghy Wolfe Tones GAC, or Bellaghy GAC, a GAA club in Bellaghy, County Londonderry
 Drumquin Wolfe Tones GAC, a GAA club in Drumquin, County Tyrone
 Greencastle Wolfe Tones GAC, a GAA club in Greencastle, County Antrim
 Kildress Wolfe Tones GAC, a GAA club in Kildress, County Tyrone
 Wolfe Tone GAC, Derrymacash, a GAA club in
 County Armagh

United States
 Chicago Wolfe Tones GFC, a Gaelic football club in Chicago, Illinois

Other
 Wolfe Tone (1763–1798), Irish republican activist
 Wolfe Tone Square, a public space in Dublin, Ireland
 Wolfe Tone Weekly, a late-1930s Irish republican newspaper

See also
 Wolfstone, a Scottish musical group